Abdul Aziz Said (September 1, 1930 – January 22, 2021) was Professor Emeritus of International Relations in the School of International Service at American University, Washington, D.C., and founding Director of the university's International Peace and Conflict Resolution Division. Said was well known for helping shift the focus of International Relations theory from real politic-based on the concept that the law of power governs states, to new world order-based on cooperation and common security. Starting in the 1990s Said focused his work on peace and conflict resolution and later explored the relationship between spirituality and religion in international politics.

Said was the first occupant of the Mohamed Said Farsi Chair of Islamic Peace and Director Emeritus and Founder of the Center for Global Peace. He was called by the university AU's “Living Legend of Peace” and a singular institution promoting peace by the Washington Post Magazine. He actively engaged in many conflict resolution projects, including the Israeli-Palestinian peace talks and the Iraq conflict. Dr. Said holds the distinction of the longest teaching tenure at AU having started teaching in 1956 until retiring in 2015. He is the author and editor of 25 books and over 100 papers. He developed over a dozen educational and research programs. Said has served as an advisor to numerous US and international agencies, including the Carter and Bush administrations, the United Nations, the US Department of State, and UNESCO. He has also served on numerous Boards, including Human Rights International and The Center for Religion and Diplomacy. He was the recipient of numerous awards, including The International Studies Association's “Distinguished Scholar in Peace Studies and the El-Hibri Peace Education Prize

Editorial boards 

 Human Rights Quarterly
 International Journal of Nonviolence
 Journal of Peacebuilding and Development
 Peace Review
 Kosmos Journal

Membership on boards of directors and/or advisors 

 Center for Democracy and Election Management (CDEM)
 Center for Peace Building International
 Center for the Study of the Presidency: National Committee to Unite a Divided America
 Council on Foreign Relations: Power-Sharing and Minority Rights in Iraq
 Council on US-Syrian Relations
 Creative Peace Building Initiatives
 El Hibri Charitable Foundation
 Findhorn Foundation, Scotland
 Fulbright Senior Specialist Program
 Global Alliance for Transnational Education (GATE)
 Global Education Associates
 Human Rights International
 International Association of University Presidents: U.N. Commission on Arms Control
 International Center for Religion and Diplomacy
 International Youth Advocate Foundation
 International Research and Exchanges Board (IREX)
 Jones International University-University of The Web
 Joint Program on Conflict Resolution (Institute for Victims of Trauma)
 Karamah – Muslim Women Lawyers for Human Rights
 Mohamed S. Farsi Foundation
 National Peace Foundation
 National Youth Advocate Program
 Nonviolence International
 Peacebuilding & Development Institute
 Search for Common Ground
 Seven Pillars House of Wisdom
 The Omega Institute
 Washington National Cathedral Interfaith Curriculum Advisory Council
 Youth Advocate Program International

Public service 

 Advisor, the United States Department of State on the “Future of Iraq” project, Democratic Principles Group
 Advisor, Undersecretary of State for Public Diplomacy 
 Member, White House Committee on the Islamic World
 President, Regional Chapter of the International Studies Association
 Member, National Council, International Studies Association
 Consultant to the United Nations Development Program
 Consultant to UNESCO
 Participant in Arab-Israeli peace dialogues
 Consultant to USIA, the Department of State, and the Department of Defense
 Prepared the Report, "Youth and Bureaucracy", for the White House Youth Conference, February, 1971.

University service 

 Member and Chair, Term Faculty Action Committee, School of International Service
 Member and Chair, The American University Faculty Senate
 Member and Chair, Faculty Relations Committee of the American University
 Member and Chair, University Admission Committee
 Member and Chair, Rank and Tenure Committee, School of International Service 
 President and Faculty, School of International Service
 Chair, International Relations Sub-Faculty, School of International Service.
 Chair, Committee on Academic Development
 Moderator, The Scholar Diplomat Program, The American University
 Chair, Library Committee of the American University
 Chair, Faculty Search Committees
 Member, Presidential Search Committee of American University

Programmatic contributions 
Contributions include developing the following educational, research and outreach programs and activities:

 AU Center for Global Peace
 Islamic Peace Studies
 International Peace Studies and Conflict Resolution
 Center for Cooperative Global Development  
 Community for Social Change and Political Participation in the Middle East and Africa  
 Center for Mediterranean Studies  
 Summer Institute for Teachers: Education for Global Citizenship  
 Creative Peacebuilding Initiatives
 Washington Semester in International Peace and Conflict Resolution
 Washington Semester in Islam and World Affairs
 Washington Semester in Foreign Policy
 Consortium PhD in Islamic Studies, greater Washington consortium

Honors, awards, and fellowships 

 International Studies Association, Distinguished Scholar of Peace Studies
 Delta Phi Epsilon Pi Award for Service and Excellence 
 American University Outstanding Contribution to Academic Development Award
 The University Faculty Award, Outstanding Service to the American University
 The Annual Award of the College of Public Affairs, Distinguished Service to the university
 Outstanding Faculty Award Mortar Board
 Faculty Excellence Award
 Status of Lecturer at the Foreign Service Institute, Department of State
 Best Speaker Award by the Washington Semester Program
 Grantee, The Rockefeller Foundation
 Grantee, The United States Institutes of Peace
 Grantee, National Endowment for Democracy
 Grantee, United States Agency for International Development
 Phi Epsilon Pi National Jewish Fraternity, “Living Legend” Award (2004)
 Abdul Aziz Said Phi Epsilon Pi Scholarship (named after)
 Abdul Aziz Said Scholarship, Peace and Conflict Resolution Studies (named after)
 African Students Association Award
 Outstanding Service Award, American University Graduate Student Association
 Multicultural Award, American University Office of Multicultural Affairs
 SIS Fall Annual Dinner Honoree, American University (2006)
 Mahatma Gandhi Foundation Fourth Annual Fellowship of Peace Award (2007)
 El-Hibri Peace Education Prize (2007)
 Honors Professor of the Year, American University Honors Program (2007-2008)
 American University Award for Outstanding Scholarship, Research and Professional Contributions (2009)
 Honorary Chairman, Golden Eagles Reunion, American University (2009)
 American University Award for Distinguished Service in the School of International Service 1957-2015 (2015)
 Recipient International Political Science Association's Teh-Kuang Chang Award for Outstanding Scholar on Asian and Pacific Studies (2018)

Selected works
Minding the Heart, Forthcoming.
“Peace, the Inside Story”, Forthcoming.
“Searching for Common Grounds and Partnerships for a Better World” New Beginning: From Discourse to Action ed. Moshen Youssef. Forthcoming.

Said, Abdul Aziz; "Localizing Peace: An Agenda for Sustainable Peacemaking," (co-authored with Nathan Funk), Peace and Conflict Studies, Spring 2010, 17.1.   

Said, Abdul Aziz; Peace as a Human Right:  Towards an Integrated Understanding, (co-authored with Charles Lerche) in Human Rights and Conflict:  Exploring the Links Between Rights, Law, and Peacebuilding (Eds.) Julie Mertus and Jeffrey W. Helsing, United States Institute of Peace, December 2006. 
Said, Abdul Aziz; Contemporary Islam: Dynamic, Not Static, co-edited with Meena Sharify-Funk and Mohammed Abu-Nimer, 2006. 
Said, Abdul Aziz; Bridges, Not Barriers, Essays on Exploring a Global Dream, The Fetzer Institute, Summer 2006, Essay Number 1. 
Said, Abdul Aziz; The World of Islam, with Abdul Karim Bangura. Pearson Custom Publishing, 2004.   

Said, Abdul Aziz; "Vision 20/20: Future of the Middle East," editor, Search for Common Ground, 2001.

Said, Abdul Aziz; Protagonists of Change: Subcultures in Development and Revolution, ed., Spectrum Books, Prentice-Hall, 1971.

See also
 Ethnic interest groups in the United States

References

External links

Celebrating 30 Years of Nonviolence International - Professor Abdul Aziz Said, March 23, 2020
American University's Living Legend, Abdul Aziz Said, May 1, 2018
C-SPAN Appearance on "Political Transition in Iraq", February 18, 2014
Abdul Aziz Said Lecture on "Contextualizing Politics", Bulgarian Embassy, Sponsored by the Institute for Cultural Diplomacy, February, 2012
Abdul Aziz Said Lecture on "Islamic-Western Peacemaking: Partnerships for a Better World", Sponsored by the Wheatley Institution at Brigham Young University, February 8, 2011
Abdul Aziz Said Interview on "Winning (or Losing) Hearts and Minds? Dialogue, Woodrow Wilson International Center for Scholars. July 9, 2011
Abdul Aziz Said Lecture on "What Peace Will Look Like", Sponsored by Baltimore Council on Foreign Affairs, September 29, 1994.
The Daily Star Lebanon Articles by Abdul Aziz Said, 1998-2005
Abdul Aziz Said Interview, "Abdul Aziz Said on the conflict in Syria". Daily Motion, Jovany Jadyn
C-SPAN Appearance on "Nuclear Issues" with Petra Kelly, March 24, 1988,
American University School of International Service  Tribute Article. https://www.american.edu/sis/news/20210215-a-tribute-to-abdul-aziz-said.cfm

Place of birth missing
American University faculty and staff
International relations scholars
Syrian academics
American male writers
American political scientists
Syrian emigrants to the United States
1930 births
2021 deaths